Redhook may refer to:

 Redhook Ale Brewery, an American brewing company
 RedHook (band), an Australian rock band
 Redhook, an imprint of Orbit Books

See also
 Red Hook (disambiguation)